The 1975 World Table Tennis Championships women's doubles was the 32nd edition of the women's doubles championship.
Maria Alexandru and Shoko Takahashi defeated Chu Hsiang-Yun and Lin Mei Chun in the final by three sets to one.

Results

See also
List of World Table Tennis Championships medalists

References

-
1975 in women's table tennis